Palumbo is a surname of Italian origin, derived from Palombo literally meaning "Ring Dove" or Palombella meaning "Wood Pigeon" in the dialects of Southern Italy. The Palumbo family crest depicts a Dove with an olive branch in its beak. Due to this many consider the meaning of Palumbo to be "Dove of Peace".  It could refer to:

 Alessio Palumbo (born 1985), Italian motorcycle racer
 Alexander Palumbo (born 1911), 1st Generation American Pennsylvania Boxing Hall of Fame
 Angela Palumbo (born 1974), Linguist and Professor
 Angy Palumbo (died 1960), Italian-British musician and composer
 Anthony Palumbo (born 1970), American Assembly member for the 2nd District of New York 
 Antonio Palumbo (footballer) (born 1996) Italian footballer
 Carmine Palumbo (born 1993) Italian footballer
 Chuck Palumbo (born 1971), American professional wrestler
 Corey Palumbo, American politician
 Curtio Palumbo (1622–??),  Roman Catholic Titular Bishop of Margarita
 Daryl Palumbo (born 1979), American rock musician
 Dave Palumbo (born 1968), American bodybuilder
 Dolores Palumbo (1912–1984), Italian actress
 Donald Palumbo, American opera chorus master
 Enrique Loedel Palumbo (1901–1962), Uruguyan-Argentine physicist
 Francisco Minà Palumbo (1814–1899), Italian naturalist
 Frank Palumbo (1910–1983), American restaurateur and philanthropist from Philadelphia, Pennsylvania, USA
 Gene Palumbo (1945–2000), American television producer and writer
 Giuseppe Palumbo (born 1975), Italian bicycle racer
 James Palumbo, Baron Palumbo of Southwark (born 1963), British entrepreneur
 Jessielyn Palumbo, Miss New Jersey USA in 2016
 Joe Palumbo (American football) (1929–2013), American college football player
 Joe Palumbo (baseball) (born 1994),  American professional baseball pitcher
 John Palumbo (born 1956), American businessman and motivational speaker
 Luigi Palumbo (born 1991), Italian footballer
 Mario Palumbo (1933–2004), American politician
 Nick Palumbo (born 1970), American film director and producer
 Onofrio Palumbo (active 1650), Italian painter of the Baroque period
 Paula Palumbo (born 1994), Brazilian film director and producer
 Peter Palumbo, Baron Palumbo (born 1935), British property developer
 Peter Palumbo (politician) (born 1961), American politician
 Rudolph Palumbo (1901–1987), British property developer of Second World War bombsites in London
 Ruth Ann Palumbo (born 1949), American politician from Kentucky
 Sam Palumbo,  former linebacker in the National Football League
 Thomas Palumbo (1950–2011), American politician 
 Tom Palumbo (born 1921), Italian-American photographer and film director
 Vincenzo Palumbo (born 1974), German footballer
 Vito Palumbo (born 1972), Italian composer

Fictional characters 
 Kid Sally Palumbo, protagonist of the novel and movie "The Gang that Couldn't Shoot Straight" by Jimmy Breslin

See also 
 Baron Palumbo
 Lord Palumbo
 Palomba